Shivering Sherlocks is a 1948 short subject directed by Del Lord starring American slapstick comedy team The Three Stooges (Moe Howard, Larry Fine and Shemp Howard). It is the 104th entry in the series released by Columbia Pictures starring the comedians, who released 190 shorts for the studio between 1934 and 1959.

Plot
The Stooges are mistaken for three armored-car thieves. Captain Mullins (Vernon Dent) gives the boys a lie detector test, but finds no reason to hold them. He releases them, under protective custody, to Gladys Harmon (Christine McIntyre), owner of the Elite Café, who gives them an alibi. They try to return the favor by working at the Café, but have trouble with this.

When Gladys is informed that she has inherited some money and a spooky old mansion, the Stooges escort her to check out the property, where the real armored car bandits, Lefty Loomis (Kenneth MacDonald), Red Watkins (Frank Lackteen) and their hideous hatchet man, Angel (Duke York), are hiding. While the Stooges are distracted due to Larry getting something to open the door and Shemp talking to Moe, Gladys is overpowered and kidnapped. The Stooges go in to search for her. Gladys meanwhile has been tied up and gagged in a back storeroom. Angel enters the room and seems about to attack her, but hears the Stooges and goes after them. The Stooges encounter him and he chases them through the house, but Shemp is able to trap all three criminals in barrels and they are arrested. Gladys has meanwhile freed herself and watches this happily. Meanwhile, Shemp accidentally drops a barrel of flour on Larry and Moe.

Cast

Credited

Production notes
Shivering Sherlocks was filmed on March 25–28, 1947; it was remade in 1955 as Of Cash and Hash, using ample stock footage.

This was the final Stooge film directed by long-time Stooge director Del Lord, as well as the only Stooge short he directed with Shemp Howard as a member of the team.

This entry features a recurring gag of "Man v. Soup," wherein one of the Stooges is about to eat a soup that, at first unbeknownst to them, contains a live bivalve that continually eats the crackers the Stooge drops in it, and a battle between the two parties ensues. In 1941's Dutiful But Dumb, Curly tries to defeat a stubborn oyster; in Shivering Sherlocks, Moe is having problems with clam chowder. Larry would recreate the routine in 1954's Income Tax Sappy.

References

External links 
 
 

1948 films
1948 comedy films
The Three Stooges films
American black-and-white films
Films directed by Del Lord
Columbia Pictures short films
American comedy short films
1940s English-language films
1940s American films